Cañada (Spanish for droveway, drovers' road) may refer to:

Places

Argentina 
Cañada de Gómez, a city in the province of Santa Fe
Cañada Rosquín, a small town (comuna) in the province of Santa Fe
La Cañada, a town in Santiago del Estero province

Mexico 
Cañada, Alaquines, San Luis Potosí
Cañadas de Obregón, a municipality in Jalisco
Cañada de la Virgen, a pre-Columbian archaeological site in the state of Guanajuato
Cañada, Guanajuato, a town in the municipality of Cortazar
Cañada, Oaxaca, a region in the state of Oaxaca that includes the districts Teotitlán and Cuicatlán
Cañada Morelos, a municipality in Puebla
La Cañada, Querétaro, a town in Mexico
La Cañada (Mexicable), an aerial lift station in Ecatepec, Mexico

Spain 
La Cañada, Valencia, a town in Valencia
Cañada, Alicante, a town in Alicante
Cañada de Benatanduz, a town in the province of Teruel, Aragón
Cañada de Calatrava, a municipality in Ciudad Real
Cañada de Morote, a village in the municipality of Molinicos
Cañada del Hoyo, a municipality in Cuenca
Cañada del Provencio, a village in the municipality of Molinicos
Cañada Juncosa, a municipality in Cuenca
Cañada Real, a shanty town in Madrid
Cañada Rosal, a city in the province of Seville
Cañada Vellida, a town in the province of Teruel, Aragón
La Cañada de Verich a town in the province of Teruel, Aragón
Observatorio de La Cañada (La Cañada Observatory), in Ávila
Villanueva de la Cañada, a town in the province of Madrid

United States 
Cañada de los Alamos, New Mexico, a census-designated place in Santa Fe County
Cañada del Oro, a primary watershed channel in the valley of Tucson, Arizona
Cañada Gobernadora, a tributary to San Juan Creek in California
Cañada Verde Creek, a stream in San Mateo County, California
La Cañada Flintridge, California

Uruguay 
Cañada Nieto, a village in the Soriano Department

Venezuela 
La Cañada de Urdaneta Municipality, municipality in the Zulia State

Other
Cañada College, a community college in California
David Cañada (1975–2016), sometimes spelt David Canada, Spanish cyclist